Collier's Magazine devoted its entire 130-page October 27, 1951 issue to narrate the events in a hypothetical Third World War, in a feature article titled "Preview of the War We Do Not Want - an Imaginary Account of Russia's defeat and Occupation, 1952-60". Twenty writers, including Edward R. Murrow, Arthur Koestler, Philip Wylie, Hal Boyle, Marguerite Higgins, and Walter Winchell, contributed to the article. The war, in which the United Nations is victorious over the Soviet Union, takes place from 1952 to 1955. Nuclear weapons are extensively used, but do not have the apocalyptic effects envisaged in other speculative scenarios.

The project, codenamed "Operation Eggnog", was put together by Associate Editor Cornelius Ryan under considerable secrecy.  The special edition led Collier's to increase its print order from 3,400,000 to 3,900,000 copies.  By spending $40,000 extra on these articles, Collier's almost doubled its usual sale of advertising.

Plot
In the scenario, Soviet and allied forces enter Yugoslavia in May 1952 to support an anti-Tito uprising organised by COMINTERN agents.  After the Soviets refuse to leave, the United States and principal United Nations countries declare war.  The US uses atomic bombs against Soviet strategic industrial complexes.  Soviet forces then proceed to invade West Germany, the Middle East, and Alaska.  US forces are in retreat on all fronts, and Korea and Japan are evacuated. London, then Detroit, New York, and Hanford are hit with nuclear weapons.

In the following year, a second salvo of Soviet bombs hit US cities. However, the US suffers fewer casualties than before, having built up its civil defence.  UN forces eventually manage to contain invading Soviet forces in the different theatres of war.  On July 22, Moscow is bombed by B-36s with nuclear weapons (witnessed by Murrow as an embedded journalist), in retaliation for a nuclear attack on Washington, D.C.  The US turns to psychological warfare by emphasising that the UN is fighting for the liberation of the Russian people, and support is provided to guerrilla forces in Soviet satellite countries.  A suicide task force of 10,000 US paratroopers destroy the last remaining Soviet nuclear stockpiles hidden in the Ural Mountains.  Soviet forces are kept pinned down in Yugoslavia by resistance fighters.

In 1954, Lavrentiy Beriya becomes the Soviet ruler; Stalin has mysteriously disappeared.  Uprisings take place across the Soviet Union and its satellite countries.  UN forces push the Soviet Army back across Europe, and by year's end have reached Warsaw and the Ukrainian border.  The Soviets are routed from Turkey and UN forces capture Crimea. Vladivostok is seized by US Marines.  Hostilities cease in the following year, and the Soviet Union plunges into chaos and internal revolt.  The UN occupies parts of the Soviet Union under UNITOC, the United Nations Temporary Occupation Command.

In the war's aftermath, a Christian Science Monitor editor reported on the rebirth of religion, unions, a free press and democracy in Russia.  A love story between a US major and a Russian girl rendered infertile by radiation is told by Philip Wylie.

See also 

 Operation Dropshot, a then-top secret contingency plan that envisioned a nuclear and conventional war with the Soviet Union

References

Novels set during World War III
Nuclear war and weapons in popular culture
Fiction set in 1952
Fiction set in 1953
Fiction set in 1954
Fiction set in 1955
Fiction set in 1960
Future history
Works about the Soviet Union
Works about the United Nations
Cultural depictions of Josip Broz Tito